= Iciliidae =

Scientific classification
- Domain: Eukaryota
- Kingdom: Animalia
- Phylum: Arthropoda
- Class: Malacostraca
- Order: Amphipoda
- Family: Iciliidae

Family of crustaceans

Iciliidae is a family of crustaceans belonging to the order Amphipoda.

Genera:

- Icilius Dana, 1849
- Paraneohela Oldevig, 1959
